Didier Alonso Chaparro López (born 7 July 1987) is a Colombian cyclist, who most recently rode for Colombian amateur team .

Major results

2009
 1st Stage 4 Clásico RCN
2012
 4th Overall Vuelta Ciclista de Chile
2015
 7th Overall Tour of Japan
2018
 1st  Overall Vuelta a Chiriquí
 3rd Overall Clásico RCN
1st Stage 7

References

External links
 

1987 births
Living people
Colombian male cyclists
20th-century Colombian people
21st-century Colombian people